Flustramorpha is a genus of bryozoans belonging to the family Microporellidae.

The species of this genus are found in Southernmost Africa.

Species:

Flustramorpha angusta 
Flustramorpha flabellaris 
Flustramorpha marginata

References

Bryozoan genera